Melitaea centralasiae is a butterfly of the family Nymphalidae. It is found in eastern Russia (eastern Altai, Sayan, Tuva, Transbaikalia, Amur, Yakutia and Magadan) and northern Mongolia.

References

Butterflies described in 1892
Butterflies described in 1929
Melitaea
Butterflies of Asia